Calpas or Kalpas, also known as Calpe or Kalpe was a river of ancient Bithynia draining into the Pontus Euxinus, between the Psilis, from which it is 210 stadia distant, and the Sangarius River. Near its mouth was the port of Calpe, through which Xenophon passed on his retreat with the Ten Thousand. Xenophon describes it as about halfway between Byzantium and Heraclea Pontica on a promontory, part which projects into the sea is an abrupt precipice. The port is under the rock to the west, and has a beach; and close to the sea there is a source of fresh water. The place is minutely described by Xenophon. Apollonius of Rhodes calls the river "deep flowing".

It is identified with the modern Ilaflı Dere.

References

Geography of Bithynia
Rivers of Turkey
Kocaeli Province
Ancient Greek geography